The 2003 World Interuniversity Games were the fifth edition of the Games (organised by IFIUS), and were held in Rome, Italy.

External links
 Homepage IFIUS

World Interuniversity Games
World Interuniversity Games
World Interuniversity Games
International sports competitions hosted by Italy
Multi-sport events in Italy
Sports competitions in Rome
2000s in Rome